The House of Monek (Hungarian: Mónek család) originated from the birth of George Mónek in 1738, after his father, Stephen Mónok (1706–1766), emigrated to Zala County. Lord Ferencz Mónoki participated in the Rákóczi's War for Independence, thus leading to the loss of privileges and nobility as a result of being a commander in the failed revolt.

The Monok dynasty took on the name of the village which they came into possession of by royal donation after military service to the royal government of Hungary. The House of Monok attained dynastic momentum 13th to the 17th centuries, until the extinction of the most senior line of Monoks. The Franciscan line moved to Szentgotthárd as hereditary serfs yet still married lower nobility. the Móneks resided in Szentgotthárd for 165 years prior to their emigration to the United States of America.

History

House of Monok

Decline and fall of the Monoky main line 
When John Monoky de Monok III was the Lord of Monok, it is noted that he rebuilt the castle of Monok. Another achievement of John III was that of becoming the Captain of the castle of Fülek during military service. Nicholas Monoky de Monok II, son of John III, then acquired the title of Baron of Monok, later achieving Baronship through his connections and alignment with King Ferdinand II of Hungary, consisting of service in the military and holding an administrative position. On August 16th, 1625, Nicholas II (d. 1643) received the title of Baron with a red seal from King Ferdinand II of Hungary, the title was hereditary and thus went to himself and his family, allowing for other family members to inherit the title.

The ownership and Lordship of Monok was continuously occupied by the Monoky, later, Baronry of Monok and the Monoky de Monok until the extinction of the Monoky male line in 1644. The Barony of Monok was inherited by the Andrássy noble dynasty through the marriage of Anna Monoky de Monok to Mátyás Andrássy de Csíkszentkirály et Krasznahorkaits. The marriage between Anna Monoky de Monok and Mátyás Andrássy de Csíkszentkirály et Krasznahorkaits would initiate the eventual partitioning of the Monoky de Monok family's lands.

Pivot to the Western Hungarian Counties 
Among what is known of Francis Monoki is his coat of arms which was documented in 1694, 1703, and 1707.

Francis II lead a force of Kurucs to capture Lőcsé from Captain Grumbach, who had command of two companies to defend the village. However, a group of armed citizens, fearing the collateral danger to the city, took the keys to the camp and forced the guard to surrender the place on November 16, 1703.

On 14 March 1766, Stephen Mónok died upon emigration across the Kingdom of Hungary to Zala County, whereupon his son, George Mónek (1738–1783), took over as head of the family. The House of Mónek, directly descendent from the Franciscan line of the Monok dynasty, is the most senior paternal line of the Monok dynasty existent. George Mónek married Maria Vari, a Hungarian noblewoman, in the Mid-18th Century and later had issue, Joseph Mónek (1775–1873), this being the formal creation of the House of Mónek. Joseph Mónek, son of George Mónek, was born circa 1775 in Szentgotthárd, and married Anna Gáál, of the House of Gáál, born of Lord Nicholas Gáál and Maria Kóczán. Joseph Mónek was the longest living member of the Monok dynasty recorded, still holding this record within the House of Mónek, later dying in the town of his birth in 1873.

Joseph Mónek and Anna Gáál had a son, named Paul Mónek (1841-1902/1903), who would live through the Compromise of 1867, solidifying Austria and Hungary as two equal states in a Dual monarchy. Paul Mónek would marry Eva Dancsecs, of the House of Dancsecs, whose parents were Lord Imre of the House of Dancsecs and Elizabeth of the House of Kóczán.

Emigration to the United States 
The head of the Mónek family, Gyula Mónek, immigrated to the United States of America following the death of his parents, Eva in 1902 and Paul in 1902/1903. Gyula Mónek immigrated to the United States of America on 25 February 1903, from the Belgian port of Antwerp, arriving at the New York City Harbor. Due to a misspelling of Mónek by United States immigration officials, the name Mónek would become consistently misspelt hereafter in legal documents within the United States of America, the Hungarian name Mónek became anglicized as Monek.

Recognition and Legitimacy 
Titles of nobility were revoked for Hungarian citizens through Statute IV of 1947 Regarding the Abolition of Certain Titles and Ranks (Hungarian: 1947. évi IV. törvény egyes címek és rangok megszüntetéséről), nobility which resided inside the state of Hungary would have their titles abolished.

However, effective the 1st of January, 2023, the Parliament of Hungary brought back the official and legal usage of titles such as Ispán, a piece of legislation which is contrary to the Statute IV of 1947. In addition, Jesse Monek is registered as Baron of Monek, a Baron of the Holy Roman Empire, according to the Holy Roman Empire Association, the same organisation also recognises his claim to Hungarian nobility.

Notable members of the House of Monek 
 George (1738–1783), father of below, married to Maria Vari, Serf.
 Joseph (1775–1873), father of below, married to Anna Gál, Serf.
 Paul (1841–1903), father of below, married to Eva Dancsecs, Serf.
 Julius (1893–1978), great-grandfather of below, married to Elizabeth Szepesi, Serf.
 Jesse, great-grandson of above, claimant to the Duchy of Jülich, Baron of Monek.

See also 

 Báró (in Hungarian)
 Hungarian nobility
 List of titled noble families in the Kingdom of Hungary

References

Sources 
"Barangolás Monokon." Royalmagazin.hu, https://web.archive.org/web/20160815151136/http://www.royalmagazin.hu/kozelet/barangolo/567-barangolas-monokon.

"Doby család." Arcanum, National Archives of Hungary, https://www.arcanum.com/en/online-kiadvanyok/Nagyivan-nagy-ivan-magyarorszag-csaladai-1/harmadik-kotet-1435/doby-csalad-203D/.

"Hungary, Church Books, 1624–1950", database, FamilySearch 
(https://www.familysearch.org/ark:/61903/1:1:6N37-VTSG : 8 December 2022), 
Georgius Monek, 1783.

"Hungary, Church Books, 1624–1950", database, FamilySearch 
(https://www.familysearch.org/ark:/61903/1:1:6NSB-RH1C : 9 December 2022), Josephi 
Mónek in entry for Anna Gaál, 1873.

"Hungary, Church Books, 1624–1950", database, FamilySearch 
(https://www.familysearch.org/ark:/61903/1:1:6N34-VZHY : 9 December 2022), Joseph 
Monek in entry for Paulus Monek, 1864.

"Hungary, Church Books, 1624–1950", database, FamilySearch (https://www.familysearch.org/ark:/61903/1:1:6N3M-9W2R : 8 December 2022), Stephanus Monok, 1766.

Kezai, Simon, et al. (1999) "Gesta Hunnorum Et Hungarorum." Central European University Press.

King Andrew II of Hungary. (1999) "De bulla aurea Andreae II regis Hungariae." 1222. Valdonega, 1999.

"Királyi Könyvek – Serial Number 18.435." Hungaricana, Libri Regii Hungaricana, https://archives.hungaricana.hu/en/libriregii/hu_mnl_ol_a057_18_0435/?list=eyJxdWVyeSI6ICJNb25vayJ9.

Makkai, László (2001). "History of Transylvania Volume I. From the Beginnings to 1606 – III. Transylvania in the Medieval Hungarian Kingdom (896–1526) – 1. Transylvania'a Indigenous Population at the Time of the Hungarian Conquest." New York: Columbia University Press, (The Hungarian original by Institute of History of the Hungarian Academy of Sciences). ISBN 0-88033-479-7.

"Monaky Castles." Kastelyok-Utazas.hu, https://web.archive.org/web/20160427000141/http://www.kastelyok-utazas.hu/Lap.php?cId=1260&kId=1260.

"Monaky-kastély ." Monok.hu, http://www.monok.hu/index.php/latnivalok/36-monaky-kastely.

"Monaky de Monak Miklós | Libri Regii | Hungaricana". archives.hungaricana.hu (in Hungarian). https://archives.hungaricana.hu/en/libriregii/hu_mnl_ol_a057_07_0321/?list=eyJxdWVyeSI6ICJNb25ha3kifQ.

"Monoky Család. (Monoki. †)." Arcanum, National Archives of Hungary, https://www.arcanum.com/hu/online-kiadvanyok/Nagyivan-nagy-ivan-magyarorszag-csaladai-1/hetedik-kotet-5828/monoky-csalad-monoki-6B2C/.

"Monoky de Monok family." Genealogy.eu, http://genealogy.euweb.cz/hung/monoky.html.

"Mónoky v. Mónok." Arcanum, National Archives of Hungary, https://www.arcanum.com/hu/online-kiadvanyok/Siebmacher-siebmacher-wappenbuch-1/der-adel-von-ungarn-magyarorszag-2/csaladok-29/monoky-v-monok-5387/.

"New York Passenger Arrival Lists (Ellis Island), 1892–1924", database with images, FamilySearch (https://familysearch.org/ark:/61903/1:1:JFTG-7MJ : 2 March 2021), Gyula Monek, 1903.

Ráth, Mór. Magyar Elektronikus Könyvtár (MEK) / Hungarian Electronic Library, Nagy Iván, https://mek.oszk.hu/09300/09379/pdf/mo_csaladai_07.pdf.

Szalay, László. "Magyarország története VI. kötet." Lipcse–Pest, 1859. PDF (In Hungarian).

Hungarian nobility
Hungarian people
Royalty and nobility of Austria-Hungary
People from the Kingdom of Hungary
European nobility
Noble families